Women's World Banking is a nonprofit organization that provides strategic support, technical assistance and information to a global network of 55 independent microfinance institutions (MFIs) and banks that offer credit and other financial services to low-income entrepreneurs in the developing world, with a particular focus on women. The Women's World Banking network serves 24 million micro-entrepreneurs in 32 countries worldwide, of which 80 percent are women. It is the largest global network of microfinance institutions and banks in terms of number of clients, and the only one that explicitly designates poor women as the focus of its mission.


Mission and vision
The mission of the Women's World Banking global network is "to expand the economic assets, participation and power of low-income women and their households by helping them access financial services, knowledge and markets."

History and governance
Women's World Banking was borne out of an idea conceived during the first United Nations World Conference on Women, held in Mexico City in 1975 to coincide with the International Women's Year and to mark the start of the “UN Decade for Women” (1976–1985). The Mexico City conference was convened by the United Nations General Assembly to focus international attention on the need to develop future-oriented goals, effective strategies, and plans of action for the advancement of women. Amidst discussions around the rights of women at the meeting, a group of ten women from five continents determined that economic independence can reinforce women's rights, enabling them to make choices and affect their own education, opportunity and well-being. Providing small loans and other financial services to poor women entrepreneurs, therefore, could be a powerful weapon in the global fight against poverty. Women's World Banking was thus founded in 1976 by several women leaders from a diversity of cultures. The Founding Committee included Michaela Walsh, the first woman manager of Merrill Lynch International, who became the organization's first president; Ela Bhatt, founder and president of India's Self Employed Women's Association (SEWA), the world's first and largest trade union for undocumented women workers; and Esther Ocloo, one of Ghana's leading entrepreneurs and a prominent advocate of the role of women in economic development, who served as the first chairperson of WWB's Board of Directors. According to Bhatt, the goal was “To reach women who have been bypassed by the traditional banking system and to bring them into the economic mainstream.”

In 1979, Women's World Banking was officially incorporated, registering in the Netherlands as Stichting (Foundation) to Promote Women's World Banking, an international nonprofit organization with the objective of providing women entrepreneurs with the capital and information necessary to access the money economy of their own countries and build viable businesses. In 1991, Nancy Barry took over from Michaela Walsh to become Women's World Banking's second president. Barry led the expansion of the Women's World Banking network to include major banks, recognizing their potential to be innovative in bringing financial services to poor populations. During Barry's tenure, the Women's World Banking network grew to reach nearly 20 million low-income entrepreneurs. Women's World Banking's current president and CEO, Mary Ellen Iskenderian, took over leadership in 2006. The global team, headquartered in New York City, consists of approximately 40 experts in microfinance representing more than 15 nationalities.

Women's World Banking is governed by a Board of Trustees, made up of representatives from the sectors of banking, finance, business, law, and community organizing. “Friends of WWB/USA, Inc.” is a 501(c) (3) tax-exempt organization which raises donations from U.S. foundations, corporations and individuals in support of Women's World Banking's global mission, and maintains a separate Board of Directors made up of U.S.-based leaders in law, finance and academia.

At the Clinton Global Initiative Annual Meeting in September 2009, President Barack Obama recalled his mother working at Women's World Banking, where “She championed the cause of women's welfare and helped pioneer the micro loans that have helped lift millions out of poverty."  The President's mother, Ann Dunham-Soetoro, was Women's World Banking's policy coordinator in the mid-1990s, and her work was pivotal in informing the policy platform of the United Nations Fourth World Conference on Women in Beijing in 1995.

Focus on women
The earliest MFIs were largely gender neutral: they sought to offer credit to low-income entrepreneurs who lacked assets to pledge as collateral and as such were deprived of access to capital by the formal banking sector – an obstacle that still affects women in disproportionate numbers today.

Research began to reveal that granting women microloans had an enduring, more profound impact on the broader well-being of the population. Access to credit gave women not just more control over household assets, but also more autonomy and decision-making power and greater participation in public life. Empowering women economically had a multiplier effect as well. Evidence showed that poor women reinvested much more of their income in their families and communities than men did – financing such items as health care, education for their children, and home improvement. The woman entrepreneur as the gateway to household and community stability became a fundamental basis for the microfinance business model and a guiding principle behind the value of microfinance as a tool for poverty alleviation.

In view of the multiplier effect of empowering women, and in keeping with its founders’ intent, Women's World Banking has since its inception concentrated specifically on enhancing the opportunities and well-being of women through economic independence. Women's World Banking has conducted extensive gender research on household dynamics and the ways in which women's roles and responsibilities impact spending, saving and investment decisions in low-income families. These studies have provided visibility into women's complex challenges as entrepreneurs, wives, mothers, and community members within their particular cultural context. On the basis of these insights, Women's World Banking applies a particular gender lens in designing and delivering products and services to help network members deepen their impact on low-income women. For example, research findings have led to gender-responsive modifications such as: simplified loan paperwork and borrowing requirements, which take into account women's lower literacy rates in many countries; changes in the design of MFI branches to accommodate women with small children; and housing loans for which women must be placed on the property title for the household to receive the loan.

Products and services
As the microfinance field matures, clients are requiring a more diversified product offering beyond credit. Women's World Banking has addressed the evolving needs of low-income women with the design and delivery of new products and services, including:

Savings products, helping the poor to build assets and achieve long-term goals, autonomy and financial security; especially geared to enable women – as the primary savers in the developing world – to plan for funding needs across their lifecycle.

Microinsurance programs, providing predefined benefits to help women and their families better cope with unanticipated financial burdens associated with a medical emergency.

Housing and Home-Improvement Loans, as home ownership implies possessing not just a valuable asset but also a means to generate rental income as a form of security, especially for women, who are more likely to be widowed or left without assets in a divorce.

Individual Lending, to provide larger, more flexible loans to growth-oriented clients.

Rural Finance, accounting for the particular challenges of lending to rural entrepreneurs, including lack of infrastructure, distant markets, inadequate farming techniques, volatile prices, unpredictable weather, and variable cash flows.

Women's World Banking also offers its network members advisory and technical assistance, including:

Market Research, quantitative and qualitative in-market studies yielding key insights about the needs of poor women; results play an essential role in informing the modification or design and delivery of customer-centric products and services.

Institutional Finance, advisory and brokering services to support MFIs in developing diversified sources of commercial funds, identifying appropriate investment partners, and negotiating with investors to achieve optimal terms.

Formalization, advice and technical assistance to MFIs undergoing the process of transforming from nonprofit organizations to regulated financial institutions, which affords increased access to commercial funding, enables product diversification such as savings, and allows MFIs to mobilize client deposits.

Marketing and Branding, helping MFIs refine their market positions, increase their customer acquisition and retention rates, and develop differentiated brand identities that engage, educate and empower low-income clients.

Thought Leadership, producing and disseminating a range of research studies and publications to support the objective of being “the pre-eminent voice for women in microfinance” and ensure an ongoing focus on women in the industry, as well as to foster peer learning and collaboration across the network and sector.

The network
As a network, Women's World Banking itself does not issue loans directly to microentrepreneurs. Rather, it serves as a partner to its 52 member institutions which lend to more than 24 million poor clients, of which 80 percent are women, in their respective markets across five regions: Africa, Asia, Eastern Europe, Latin America and the Caribbean, and the Middle East and North Africa. The network represents an outstanding loan portfolio of more than US$5.5 billion and an average loan size per borrower of $1,200 (based on 2009 data).

Studies have shown that by mobilizing resources outside their immediate control, networked nonprofits achieve their missions more efficiently, effectively, and sustainably than they could have by working alone. Women's World Banking offers its network members services for which scale improves efficiency. From a centralized vantage point, Women's World Banking is able to conduct market research, gather global insights, spot trends, and facilitate peer-to-peer learning. Much of a network's power lies in the support that its members give to each other: Women's World Banking member institutions share product and process innovations, relay best practices and lessons learned, evaluate each other, and hold each other accountable for results. Women's World Banking was one of the first microfinance networks to require its members to sign a pledge, committing explicitly to adhere to performance standards and support empowerment of low-income women as entrepreneurs, leaders, and change agents in order to maintain membership in the network.

In 2007, ten Women's World Banking network members were named to Forbes magazine's first-ever list of the world's top 50 MFIs.  Thirteen network members were named to the 2009 Global 100 Composite Ranking by the Microfinance Information Exchange (the MIX), a nonprofit organization that provides business information and data services for the microfinance industry. This list highlights institutions that achieve high outreach and low transaction costs while being both profitable and transparent.

Women and leadership
Women's leadership has been a core element of microfinance since the industry's inception. Many of the industry's pioneers were women, and a solid female managerial contingent held steady as MFIs grew. Even today, in comparison with other industries, women leaders maintain a robust presence in microfinance.

The business case for gender diversity in microfinance maintains that organizations that successfully hire, retain and promote women will achieve not just social benefits, but also financial returns. According to a 2007 report, Fortune 500 companies with the highest representation of women board directors attained significantly higher financial performance on average than those with the lowest representation. More specifically, a 2007 study of 226 MFIs in 57 countries demonstrated that when the CEO of an MFI was a woman, the MFI showed a higher return on assets and lower operational costs.

The premise that gender diversity in leadership makes good business sense also has been borne out in research conducted by Catalyst, a nonprofit that works globally to expand opportunities for women in the workplace. Catalyst has observed, “The more a company mirrors its markets demographically, the better positioned it is to sense and respond to evolving market needs.” A 2008 leadership survey conducted by Women's World Banking showed that female loan officers and women authority figures make powerful role models for their female customers. An MFI with a gender-diverse work force can therefore differentiate itself as an organization committed to understanding and serving women. Women's World Banking works to help network members acquire, retain and better serve their women staff and leaders, which in turn helps to attract new female clients.

There is evidence in recent years that as MFIs have faced unprecedented rates of growth – the microfinance industry saw a compound annual growth rate of 43 percent between 2004 and 2008  – the pressure to become more commercially oriented as well as the need for skill sets from the private sector are increasing, and the percentage of women in leadership positions in the microfinance industry is declining. This trend is apparent even in women-founded MFIs with long-standing commitments to serving low-income women: research shows that within Women's World Banking member institutions between 2003 and 2007, the percentage of women in board positions declined from 66 percent to 58 percent and in senior management from 66 percent to 51 percent.

The concern in the industry is that such changes compromise the effectiveness of leadership and ongoing focus on the mission of helping poor women. In 2009, Women's World Banking founded the Center for Microfinance Leadership to engage diverse leaders with the skills and values to both understand microfinance's dual objectives of financial stability and poverty alleviation, and set the vision, principles and practices of the sector. Founded in partnership with the Wharton School of the University of Pennsylvania and executive development firm Creative Métier Limited, the Center offers individual leadership programs, coaching, and practitioner exchanges, as well as institutional programs designed to improve gender diversity and develop managerial talent.

Women's World Banking and recent trends in microfinance

Commercialization 

The recent influx of commercial and institutional funds into microfinance has reduced the industry's reliance on subsidized donor funding and moved more into the commercial mainstream. This evolution has raised concerns about a drift away from many of the original tenets of microfinance – a focus on lending to the poorest segments of society in general and poor women in particular. In 2008, Women's World Banking conducted research to assess the degree to which pressure to generate profits dilutes the aim of poverty alleviation. The study, Stemming the Tide of Mission Drift: Microfinance Transitions and the Double Bottom Line, found that after transformation, the proportion of women served by formalized institutions dropped dramatically, from 88 percent to 60 percent. It also found that average loan sizes were two to three times greater than those of non-commercialized organizations.  These results may serve as evidence that a lower percentage of loans are going to women, because they tend to borrow smaller sums. A Financial Times article quoted Mary Ellen Iskenderian on the risks of mission drift: "Ensuring that women do not lose out in access to microfinance as institutions grow is vital. There are 30 years of data showing that women put more of their loans than men do into education, healthcare and nutrition, that their children stay in school longer and have longer life expectancy."

Microfinance’s impact

In 2010, as a reaction to the publication of several research studies examining the impact of microfinance based on randomized, controlled trials, a number of questions were raised in prominent media about whether microfinance has made a quantitative improvement in the lives of borrowers or has had any effect on poverty alleviation on a systemic basis. Women's World Banking, along with fellow microfinance organizations ACCION, FINCA, Grameen Foundation, Opportunity International, and Unitus, released a collective statement in response to the studies, evoking the challenges and complexities of assessing microfinance's impact and the limitations of such studies. First, studies were based on short-term data, and signs of impact from borrowing typically do not manifest themselves until several loan cycles have passed, requiring longer research periods to see results. Second, quantitative studies often do not take into account qualitative evidence of financial and social inclusion and empowerment that is not based on specific data points such as consumption patterns.  Women's World Banking has observed that indications of impact themselves are often small and very gradual: for example, making the improvement in a home from a mud to a wood floor, or from a cardboard roof to a metal one; or perhaps keeping a girl child in school for another year instead of ending her education so that she can work to help support the family. Many microfinance experts posit that rather than microfinance being a panacea for poverty alleviation, access to financial services brings a measure of stabilization to the otherwise precarious lives of the poor. In a Forbes.com article, Mary Ellen Iskenderian stated that women's empowerment is "infinitely harder to measure but every bit as important as the economic change."

References

Banking institutes
Women's occupational organizations
International charities
International women's organizations
Charities based in New York City
Microfinance banks